Gillie Aldah Larew (July 28, 1882 – January 2, 1977) was an American mathematician, the first alumna of Randolph–Macon Woman's College to become a full professor there, and eventually the dean of the college.

Early life and education
Larew was the daughter of farmer and lawyer Captain I. H. Larew, and was born on July 28, 1882, in Pulaski County, Virginia. Her father had eleven children, three of whom died before Larew was born and five of whom were from a second wife after Larew's mother died in 1887. She was privately schooled before attending Randolph–Macon Woman's College from 1899 to 1903.

In 1906 she began studying for a master's degree in mathematics at the University of Chicago over the summers, during breaks from her teaching position, completing the degree in 1911. From 1914 to 1916 she studied there again for a doctorate. Her dissertation concerned the calculus of variations; it was Necessary Conditions for the Problem of Mayer in the Calculus of Variations, and was supervised by Gilbert Ames Bliss.
It was one of the earliest works of mathematics to call Lagrange multipliers by that name.

Career and later life
In 1903, after finishing her studies at Randolph–Macon, Larew was hired as an instructor there. She became an adjunct professor in 1909. After completing her doctorate she became an associate professor. In 1921 was promoted to full professor, the first Randolph–Macon alumna to reach that position.

She took a year leave in 1929–1930 to study in Europe with Constantin Carathéodory, and in 1936 became head of the mathematics department.
In 1950 she became dean of the college, and served as dean until her retirement in 1953.

She died on January 2, 1977, in Lynchburg, Virginia.

Legacy
In 1948 the Randolph–Macon alumnae association endowed a professorship at Randolph–Macon, the Gillie A. Larew chair of mathematics, to honor "Randolph–Macon's most valuable alumna".
The annual Gillie A. Larew Distinguished Teaching Award is the oldest of Randolph College's faculty awards.

A portrait of Larew by painter Winslow Williams, commissioned in 1986 by the alumnae of Randolph-Macon Woman's College, is part of the permanent collection of the Maier Museum at Randolph College.

References

20th-century American mathematicians
American women mathematicians
Randolph College alumni
University of Chicago alumni
Randolph College faculty
20th-century women mathematicians
1882 births
1977 deaths
20th-century American women